Desmond Neville Devine-Jones (15 August 1928 – 11 July 2010) was a Brigadier in the Army Physical Training Corps (APTC) of the Indian Army. He was part of the 1951 Indian Men's Football team at the 1951 Asian Games which won the gold medal in Delhi.

Devine-Jones was also the boxing coach for the Indian Olympic team for the 1972 Munich Olympics, as well as the country's flag bearer. He was elected secretary of the Indian Amateur Boxing Federation in 1976 and then reelected in 1980. He was an AIBA qualified Referee and Judge and officiated many international boxing championships. He was also elected as an executive committee member of AIBA in 1986.

Honours

India
Asian Games Gold medal: 1951

References

External links
 
 

1928 births
2010 deaths
Indian Army officers
Indian male boxers
Indian footballers
India international footballers
Footballers from Pune
Asian Games medalists in football
Footballers at the 1951 Asian Games
Medalists at the 1951 Asian Games
Boxers from Maharashtra
Anglo-Indian people
Asian Games gold medalists for India
Association football midfielders